Tainan may refer to:

Places in Taiwan
 Tainan City, a city in southern Taiwan
 Tainan County, a county in southern Taiwan
 Tainan Airport, a commercial airport in Tainan City, Taiwan
 Tainan Station, a railway station in Tainan City, Taiwan
 Tainan Municipal Baseball Stadium, a baseball stadium in Tainan City, Taiwan
 Tainan University of Technology, a private university in the Tainan metropolitan area, Taiwan
 Tainan Science Park, Tainan City, Taiwan

Japanese Navy
 Tainan Air Group, a fighter aircraft and airbase garrison unit of the Imperial Japanese Navy during the Pacific campaign of World War II

See also 

 Tinian